Tony 'TJ' Jewell (born 8 December 1943) is a former Australian rules football player who played in the VFL between 1964 and 1970 for the Richmond Football Club.

Playing career

Richmond Football Club
He was recruited from Oakleigh in the VFA where he had led the club's goalkicking in 1962 and was placed 4th in the VFA's best & fairest award, the J. J. Liston Trophy, in 1963. Jewell played for Richmond Football Club, where he played a total of 80 games between 1964 and 1970.

Coaching career
His initial coaching experience after leaving Richmond was with Caulfield then in the second division of VFA. He led them to the 2nd division premiership and promotion to the top division in 1973.

Richmond Football Club
He was senior coach of Richmond from 1979 to 1981, which included winning the 1980 premiership, but was sacked to make way for Francis Bourke. He later returned to coach the Richmond Football Club as senior coach in his second stint from 1986 to 1987.

St Kilda Football Club
He was also senior coach of St Kilda in 1983 and 1984.

References 

 Hogan P: The Tigers Of Old, Richmond FC, Melbourne 1996
Richmond Football Club - Hall of Fame
Fiddian, Marc: Devils at Play. A History of the Oakleigh Football Club, Pakenham Gazette, Pakenham 1982

External links 
 
 

St Kilda Football Club coaches
Living people
Richmond Football Club players
Richmond Football Club Premiership players
Richmond Football Club coaches
Richmond Football Club Premiership coaches
Caulfield Football Club players
Caulfield Football Club coaches
Oakleigh Football Club players
1943 births
Australian rules footballers from Victoria (Australia)
One-time VFL/AFL Premiership players
One-time VFL/AFL Premiership coaches